The 1976 European Super Cup was played between Anderlecht of Belgium and Bayern Munich of West Germany, with Anderlecht winning 5–3 on aggregate.

First leg

Second leg

See also
FC Bayern Munich in international football competitions
R.S.C. Anderlecht in European football

References

External links
UEFA Super Cup
RSSSF

1976–77 in European football
1976
Uefa Super Cup 1976
R.S.C. Anderlecht matches
1976
1976
1976–77 in Belgian football
1976–77 in German football
Sports competitions in Brussels
August 1976 sports events in Europe
1976 in West German sport
Sports competitions in Munich
1970s in Munich
1970s in Brussels